Wild West Express Coaster is a steel roller coaster operating at Glenwood Caverns Adventure Park in Glenwood Springs, Colorado. Wild West Express Coaster opened to the public at Glenwood Caverns Adventure Park on May 25, 2012.

History

Wild Zone Adventures
Originally opened at Wild Zone Adventures in Chatham, Ontario as Endicott Emerald Mine. The coaster was also called Runaway Mine Train. On June 30, 2009, Wild Zone Adventures was donated to Municipality of Chatham-Kent for funds to build a brand new entertainment center and also to be transformed into a Holiday Inn.

Glenwood Caverns Adventure Park (2012)
On February 20, 2012, Glenwood Caverns Adventure Park went before the Garfield Board of County Commissioners to be able to add several new attractions in the future. Then on February 29, 2012, Glenwood Caverns Adventure Park announced several new attractions set to open in late spring 2012 including Wild West Express Coaster.

See also
 2012 in amusement parks

References

Roller coasters in Colorado
Glenwood Caverns Adventure Park